The 1948 United States presidential election in Ohio was held on November 2, 1948 as part of the 1948 United States presidential election. State voters chose 25 electors to the Electoral College, who voted for president and vice president.

Ohio was narrowly won by Democratic Party candidate, incumbent President Harry S. Truman with 49.48% of the popular vote. Republican Party candidate Thomas E. Dewey received 49.24% of the popular vote. The state had previously gone to Dewey against Franklin D. Roosevelt four years earlier. , this is the last time a Democrat won Ohio but lost neighboring Pennsylvania.

This was the closest margin of any state in the election.

This was one of five states flipped by Truman (the others being Colorado, Iowa, Wisconsin, & Wyoming), and one of 18 states that changed party overall.

Ohio would not vote Democratic again until Lyndon B. Johnson’s landslide victory in 1964.

Results

Results by county

See also
 United States presidential elections in Ohio

References

Ohio
1948
1948 Ohio elections